The 2010 Winter Paralympics were held in Vancouver, British Columbia, Canada, from March 12 to March 21, 2010. A total 506 athletes from 44 National Paralympic Committees (NPCs) participated in these Games. Overall, 64 events in 5 disciplines were contested.

Canada finished third overall in gold medal wins, with 10 gold medals. Russia placed first in total medals, with 38.

{| id="toc" class="toc" summary="Contents"
|align="center"|Contents
|-
|
Alpine skiing
Biathlon
Cross-country skiing
|valign=top|
Ice sledge hockey
Wheelchair curling
|valign=top|
|-
|align=center colspan=3| Medal leaders       References
|}


Alpine skiing

Biathlon

Cross-country skiing

Wheelchair curling

* suspended

Ice sledge hockey

Medal leaders
Athletes that won at least two gold medals or at least three total medals are listed below.

See also
List of 2010 Winter Olympics medal winners

References

Medal winners
2010 Winter Paralympics medal winners
2010 Winter Paralympics medal winners
2010 Winter Paralympics medal winners